Zoic may refer to:
Zoic Studios, a visual effects company
-zoic, a Greek root in English referring to animals